The Reverend Horatius Holipheal Coleman  (February 22, 1892 – December 13, 1969), better known as H. H. Coleman, was an American church pastor and evangelist.  Reverend Coleman, who was born in Decatur, Georgia, was senior pastor of Greater Macedonia Baptist Church in Detroit, Michigan, from 1935 until his death in 1969.  He was the paternal great-grandfather of former U.S. Representative Kendrick B. Meek, and the maternal grandfather of actress Barbara Meek.

Rev. Coleman was a good friend of Rev. Martin Luther King Sr., father of Dr. Martin Luther King Jr. On May 3, 1936, King Jr. (age 7) was baptized at Ebenezer Baptist Church in Atlanta, Georgia, after a two-week annual revival that was led by Rev. H. H. Coleman (serving as guest evangelist).

References

"Revival Drawing Fine Crowds at Ebenezer."  Atlanta Daily World 21 April 1936. p. 1

External links

An historical look at Beulah Baptist Church
First Baptist Institutional Church - About Us
New Bethel Baptist Church - Usher Ministry
History of Calvary Baptist Church
Michigan Progressive Baptist Convention - History
Jet Magazine, Vol. 30, No. 1, p. 45- Apr 14, 1966 - Google Books
Jet Magazine, Vol. 31, No. 21, p. 56- Mar 2, 1967 - Google Books
Lee, Paul. "Dr. Martin Luther King, Jr., in Michigan, 1945-68." The Michigan Citizen
Rev. H.H. Coleman Family Responsibility LP Detroit Sermon - Ebay
Journal of the House of Representatives of the State of Michigan, 1969 Volume 4, pp. 3638-3639 - Memorial to Reverend H.H. Coleman - Snippet
Salvatore, Nick. "Singing in a strange land: C.L. Franklin, the Black church, and the Transformation of America" : Little, Brown, pp. 112 and 229 - Google Books

1892 births
Clergy from Detroit
1969 deaths
20th-century Baptist ministers from the United States
Baptists from Georgia (U.S. state)
Baptists from Michigan